Dobrowolski is a ghost town in Atascosa County, in the U.S. state of Texas. According to the Handbook of Texas, the community had a population of 10 in 2000. It is located within the San Antonio metropolitan area.

History
Dobrowolski was originally called Tobey (also spelled Toby). A post office was established there in 1894 and remained in operation until 1919. It was listed as Tobey on county maps as late as the 1940s. It was named for local land speculator Thomas Toby, who was said to have managed a ranch in New Orleans and lived in the area around 1858. The community's population was 200 in 1896 and had a general store and gin that same year. Another post office was established at Dobrowolski in 1920 and remained in operation until 1934. Both the community and post office were named for Alec Dobrowolski, who sold farmland in the area. Its population was 50 in 1925, lost half of its population in the early 1930s, grew to 75 in 1939, and dropped to 15 in the 1960s. Its population was 10 from 1970 through 2000. Only a few scattered homes remained in Dobrowolski by the 1980s but was no longer featured on county highway maps.

Geography

Education
In 1896, Dobrowolski had a music teacher. In 1904, it had a school with 38 students and one teacher. It increased to 65 students in 1913 and 81 in 1934 and gained another teacher that same year. The school joined the Charlotte Independent School District in 1936. The community is served by the Charlotte ISD to this day.

References

Ghost towns in Texas